Gempol-Pasuran Toll Road or Gempas Toll Road is a toll road in East Java, Indonesia. This  highway connects Gempol  with Pasuruan. It is the easternmost part Trans-Java Expressway.

History
On March 31, 2017, Section IB from Bangil to Rembang has been opened, and on August 3, 2017, Section IIA from Gempol to Bangil has been opened. Section II from Rembang to Pasuruan has formally opened on June 22, 2018. The remaining part of the toll road was inaugurated on December 20, 2018.

Sections
It consists of three sections: 

Exits

References

Toll roads in Indonesia
Transport in East Java